Ajoy Mukhopadhyay (born 27 August 1928 Raruli, Khulna district, (now in Bangladesh)) was member of 9th Lok Sabha from Krishnanagar (Lok Sabha constituency) in West Bengal, India.

He was elected to 9th, 10th, 11th and 12th Lok Sabha from Krishanagar constituency in Nadia district. He died on 24 July 2019 at the age of 90.

References

1928 births
People from Khulna District
India MPs 1989–1991
India MPs 1991–1996
India MPs 1996–1997
India MPs 1998–1999
West Bengal politicians
Lok Sabha members from West Bengal
2019 deaths